"Towards a Global Ethic: An Initial Declaration" is a 1993 document by members of the Parliament of the World's Religions that details ethical commitments shared by many of the world's religious, spiritual, and cultural traditions. It is the Parliament's signature document.

History 
At the request of the Council for a Parliament of the World's Religions, Hans Küng, President of the Foundation for a Global Ethic (Stiftung Weltethos), wrote an initial draft in consultation with fellow scholars and religious leaders. The Council's leaders and Trustees then worked on the draft in consultation with Küng and another extensive network of leaders and scholars from various religions and regions. Most notable in leading this effort were Daniel Gómez-Ibáñez, the Executive Director of the Council, and Thomas A. Baima, a member of the Board of Trustees.

In the summer of 1993, "The Global Ethic" was ratified as an official document of the Parliament of the World's Religions by a vote of its Trustees. It was then signed by more than 200 leaders from 40+ different faith traditions and spiritual communities during the Parliament's 1993 gathering in Chicago. Since 1993 leaders and individuals around the world continue to endorse the Global Ethic with their signatures. It has served as a common ground for people to discuss, to agree, and to cooperate for the good of all.

Later the Parliament decided to add a fifth directive. Led by Myriam Renaud, the Parliament's Global Ethic Project Director, a task force wrote an initial draft. After reflecting on 100+ pages of comments offered by scholars and religious leaders, the task force submitted a final draft to the Trustees for their vote. The fifth directive became official in July 2018.

On May 20, 2007, the founder of the Global Ethic Foundation, Hans Küng, received the Culture Award of German Freemasons (in German: Kulturpreis Deutscher Freimaurer) by hands of the German Grand Master Jens Oberheide who presented him as a "free and brave thinker" and a man who spoke "straight from our Masonic hearts".

Fundamental ethical demands 
The declaration identifies two fundamental ethical demands as its foundation. First: the Golden Rule: What you wish done to yourself, do to others, "a principle which is found and has persisted in many religious and ethical traditions of humankind of thousands of years." Second: every human being must be treated humanely.

Shared directives 
The two fundamental ethical demands are made concrete in four directives, which are "convincing and practical for all women and men of good will, religious and non-religious". These directives are elaborated in the Global Ethic. They are commitments to a culture of:

 Non-violence and respect for life
 Solidarity and a just economic order
 Tolerance and a life of truthfulness
Equal rights and partnership between men and women
Sustainability and care for the Earth (2018)

Other unique features

Things held in common 
The Global Ethic acknowledges that significant differences distinguish various religions. The directives instead proclaim publicly those things that they hold in common and jointly affirm. Each tradition holds those things to be true on the basis of its own religious or ethical grounds.

References 
No religious or theological terms appear in the Global Ethic.

Principles 
Küng describes several working parameters: It should

 make a clear distinction between the ethical level and the purely legal or political level
 avoid duplicating the Universal Declaration of Human Rights (because an ethic is more than rights)
 avoid political declarations
 avoid casuistry
 forego any attempt to craft a philosophical treatise
 avoid religious proclamations.

On a positive programmatic level, the declaration must:

 penetrate to the level of binding values, irrevocable criteria, and attitudes
 secure moral unanimity and steer clear of statements rejected by participants
 offer constructive criticism
 relate to the world as it really is
 use language familiar to newspaper readers (avoid jargon)
 have a religious foundation since, for religious people, an ethic must have a religious foundation

See also
Hans Küng
Parliament of the World's Religions
Universal Declaration of Human Rights
Rights
Casuistry
Treatise
Buddhism
Hinduism
Sustainability
Earth
Leonard Swidler
Myriam Renaud

References

External links
Parliament of the World's Religions

"Towards a Global Ethic: An Initial Declaration"
Early draft of Global Ethic Declaration
Weltethos Institute in Germany

Interfaith dialogue
Religious ethics
Global ethics
Ethics literature